Guillaume Pouget (14 October 1847 – 24 February 1933) was a Vincentian priest who had great influence on many Christian scholars in the early 20th century.

Life

Guillaume Pouget was born to a poor farming family on 14 October 1847 in Morsanges, a hamlet in the Maurines commune of Cantal  from Saint-Flour, Cantal. He was the oldest of six children.
His parents' house was a small, low building of large granite blocks built in 1827, with a ground floor room lit by two windows, and a bedroom on the floor above.
He had taught himself to read by the age of five. He first went to school when he was twelve, but only during the winter, helping his father in the fields during the rest of the year. The local priest noticed his extraordinary gifts and persuaded his parents to let him continue his studies. At the age of 15 he was enrolled in the minor seminary of Saint Flour.

Pouget completed his studies at the age of 19 and became a priest of the Pères Lazaristes. 
From 1872 to 1905 he taught various subjects at Évreux, Saint Flour, Dax and Paris. 
On 20 July 1905 he was forbidden from further teaching since he was "too far ahead of his time", despite the support of his superior. 
He accepted this ruling, but continued to be the spiritual father of many priests and intellectuals who came to him for advice.
His eyesight began to deteriorate in 1873, and he lost his right eye in April 1895. His left eye failed in January 1909 and he became totally blind. 
Guillaume Pouget died on 24 February 1933, and is buried in Montparnasse Cemetery.

Publications
Pouget did not publish on his own initiative under his own name, but the following articles have been identified as his:

.

Some of his writings was later published by the Lyon printing house La Source of Victor Carlhian. These included:

Posthumous publications include:

Notes

Sources

Further reading

1847 births
1933 deaths
French Roman Catholic priests